Agatha and the Curse of Ishtar is a 2019 British alternative history television drama film about crime writer Agatha Christie becoming embroiled in a real-life murder case during a trip to an archaeological dig in Iraq following her divorce. The film premiered on Channel 5 in the United Kingdom on 15 December 2019. Filming took place in Malta and was directed by Sam Yates. Agatha and the Curse of Ishtar premiered in the United States on PBS May 18, 2021.

Plot
In 1928, following her divorce and struggling with fame and success, Agatha Christie travels to Iraq and is caught in a web of murder, intrigue and love. Two years following the public drama caused by her 11-day disappearance, Agatha arrives in Baghdad seeking culture and peace.  Instead she finds an attractive young archaeologist with a bullet wound, and the famous crime writer must unravel a series of mysterious murders.

Cast
Lyndsey Marshal as Agatha Christie
Jonah Hauer-King as Max Mallowan 
Stanley Townsend as Sir Constance Bernard 
Jack Deam as Leonard Woolley
Katherine Kingsley as Katharine Woolley 
Waj Ali as Ezekiel
Rory Fleck Byrne as Marmaduke
Bronagh Waugh as Lucy Bernard
Crystal Clarke as Pearl Theroux
 Liran Nathan as Faisal
 Walles Hamonde as Ahkam
 Waleed Elgadi as Doctor El-Memar
 Daniel Gosling as Hugo

Production
The film was created by husband and wife team Tom and Emily Dalton who also created Agatha and the Truth of Murder which was Channel 5's most watched festive programme of 2018.  This was shot in Malta, back-to-back with Agatha and the Midnight Murders.

Reception
Described as "quite a treat" by Michael Hogan in The Daily Telegraph, The Times wrote that "what it lacked in unexpected twists and depth it made up for in nostalgic comfort-blanketry and good, clean murder".

References

External links
 
  Agatha and the Curse of Ishtar at Darlow Smithson Productions

Cultural depictions of Agatha Christie
2019 television films
Films shot in Malta
2019 films
2019 drama films
2010s British films
British drama television films